Vicente Guaita Panadero (born 10 January 1987) is a Spanish professional footballer who plays as a goalkeeper for  club Crystal Palace.

He appeared in 176 La Liga matches over eight seasons with Valencia and Getafe, as well as a season on loan with Recreativo in the Segunda División. In 2018, he signed with Crystal Palace.

Club career

Valencia
Born in Torrent, Valencian Community, Guaita graduated from the Valencia youth system after arriving there from CD Monte-sión at the age of 13, being promoted to the first team for the 2008–09 season following the retirement of longtime incumbent Santiago Cañizares. Additionally, as German Timo Hildebrand became ostracised by coach Unai Emery, he became the backup.

Guaita made his official debut with the main squad on 2 October 2008, in a UEFA Cup tie against Marítimo (2–1 home win). However, after the signing of veteran César Sánchez from Tottenham Hotspur later in the year and the full recovery of Renan, he remained third choice until the end of the campaign.

In 2009–10, with Sánchez having renewed his link a further year and the signing of Mallorca's Miguel Ángel Moyá, Guaita was deemed surplus to requirements and joined, on loan, Segunda División's Recreativo de Huelva. As the Andalusians finished comfortably in mid-table he was awarded the competition's Ricardo Zamora Trophy, with just 24 goals conceded in 30 appearances.

In November–December 2010, profiting from injuries to both César and Moyà, Guaita had a run of several matches for Valencia, notably a 2–1 home win against Almería in La Liga and a 1–1 draw away to Manchester United in the UEFA Champions League. On 2 April 2011, as he had established himself in the starting XI, he suffered the loss of his father due to a heart attack (aged only 46), prompting manager Emery to reinstate César between the posts for two games.

In May 2011, Guaita extended his contract with Valencia until 2015. He began the season as the starter, but picked up a serious hand injury in early November 2011, being nonetheless selected to several games by Emery as the reserve.

Getafe

On 31 July 2014, Guaita was sold to Getafe with a buy-back option. He made his debut for his new team on 24 August, in a 3–1 away loss to Celta.

In the 2016–17 campaign, with the club again in the second tier, Guaita played little due to injury. He was, however, the starter in the play-offs, which ended in promotion.

Crystal Palace
On 2 February 2018, Crystal Palace manager Roy Hodgson confirmed Guaita had agreed to join from 1 July on a free transfer. The transfer was reconfirmed by the club on 8 June, with the player joining on a three-year contract. He made his Premier League debut on 15 December, keeping a clean sheet in a 1–0 home win against Leicester City.

Guaita eventually became the starter, relegating Wayne Hennessey to the bench. On 1 February 2021, he agreed to an extension until the summer of 2023, and in June was voted his team's player of the season. In January 2023 Guaita signed a further extension until June 2024.

Career statistics

Honours
Getafe
Segunda División play-offs: 2017

Individual
Ricardo Zamora Trophy: 2009–10 Segunda División
Crystal Palace Player of the Year: 2020–21

Notes

References

External links

CiberChe biography and stats 

1987 births
Living people
People from Torrent, Valencia
Sportspeople from the Province of Valencia
Spanish footballers
Footballers from the Valencian Community
Association football goalkeepers
La Liga players
Segunda División players
Segunda División B players
Tercera División players
Valencia CF Mestalla footballers
Valencia CF players
Recreativo de Huelva players
Getafe CF footballers
Premier League players
Crystal Palace F.C. players
Spanish expatriate footballers
Expatriate footballers in England
Spanish expatriate sportspeople in England